The 1947–48 season was the Tri-Cities Blackhawks' second season in the National Basketball League (NBL) and its first full season in Moline, Illinois. The Blackhawks moved from the Eastern Division to the Western Division; the team finished .500 and qualified for postseason play for the first time.

Roster

 Head Coach: Nat Hickey

Regular season

Western Division standings

Playoffs
Won Opening Round (Indianapolis Kautskys) 3–1 Lost Division Semifinals (Minneapolis Lakers) 0–2

Awards and records
Don Otten – All-NBL Second Team
Robert McDermott – All-NBL Second Team

References

Atlanta Hawks seasons
Tri-Cities